Dabaishu is a station on the Shanghai Metro Line 3.

Until October 2006, it was known as East Wenshui Road station, which could be confused with  station on Line 1. The name was changed according to the new convention to name metro stations after famous streets or sights nearby rather than the vertical street neighbouring the station, making it easier for visitors to find these places.

Places nearby
 Dabaishu Industry and Trading Center

References

External links 

 Three Metro station names will be changed (Shanghai Daily)

Line 3, Shanghai Metro
Shanghai Metro stations in Hongkou District
Railway stations in China opened in 2000
Railway stations in Shanghai